Ansalta is a rural locality (a selo) in Ansaltinsky Selsoviet, Botlikhsky District, Republic of Dagestan, Russia. The population was 4,598 as of 2010. There are 19 streets.

Geography 
Ansalta is located 16 km northwest of Botlikh (the district's administrative centre) by road. Shodroda is the nearest rural locality.

References 

Rural localities in Botlikhsky District